Julie Ruocco is a French writer.

Biography 
Ruocco studied international relations at Sciences Po Aix before working at the European Parliament for Karima Delli. In 2016, she published a philosophical work, Et si jouer était un art ? Notre subjectivité esthétique à l'épreuve du jeu vidéo. In 2021, she published her first novel Furies noting that the COVID-19 lockdown in 2020 gave her the time to focus solely on the book. The novel, set during the Syrian Civil War is about a French archaeologist who smuggles antiquities from Syria to Europe and a Syrian firefighter turned gravedigger. Themes include the bravery of women, the effects of war and the plight of the Kurds.

Books 
Et si jouer était un art ? Notre subjectivité esthétique à l'épreuve du jeu vidéo, Editions L'Harmattan, 2016, 
Furies, Actes Sud, 2021,

References 

Living people
People from Ardennes (department)
Sciences Po Aix alumni
21st-century French novelists
Year of birth missing (living people)